The Jasper County Courthouse in Jasper, Texas is a building from 1889. It was listed on the National Register of Historic Places on September 6, 1984. The courthouse was designed by Eugene T. Heiner in an Italianate style with clock tower. It was stuccoed and altered when additions were added in 1934 giving the building a Neoclassical look. The clock tower was removed in 1957. Another addition was built on in 1960.

See also

National Register of Historic Places listings in Jasper County, Texas

References

External links

Courthouses on the National Register of Historic Places in Texas
Buildings and structures in Jasper County, Texas
County courthouses in Texas
National Register of Historic Places in Jasper County, Texas